Overkill was a Marvel UK anthology published during the 1990s, deliberately designed as a Marvel equivalent to  2000AD.

Originally there was an editorially-directed policy of no Marvel US superheroes appearing in Overkill (meaning it could only reprint 11 pages of each Marvel UK story, excising 11 that had deliberate US guest-stars) - market research indicated this was counter-productive and the policy was dropped, with Death's Head taking a prominent role in the comic.

Titles
Death's Head II
Knights of Pendragon
Motormouth
Dark Angel
Digitek
Warheads

Marvel UK titles